, released in English as Nisekoi: False Love, is a Japanese romantic comedy manga series written and illustrated by Naoshi Komi. It was first published as a one-shot manga in Shueisha's seasonal Jump NEXT! magazine, before being serialized in Weekly Shōnen Jump. In December 2011, Shueisha published the first chapter in English online. Viz has since published all the volumes.

Volume list

References

External links
 Nisekoi at Viz Media

Nisekoi